Dabravka is a village in Vidin Province in northwestern Bulgaria. It is located in the municipality of Belogradchik. In the local dialect it is pronounced "Dabrava".

References

Sources
 Michev Nicholas & Peter Koledarov. "Dictionary of settlements and settlement names in Bulgaria 1878-1987", Sofia, 1989.

External links
 Vidin-online

Villages in Vidin Province
Belogradchik Municipality